Azariah ben Moses dei Rossi (Hebrew: עזריה מן האדומים) was an Italian-Jewish physician and scholar. He was born at Mantua in  1511; and died in 1578. He was descended from an old Jewish family which, according to a tradition, was brought by Titus from Jerusalem. He was known among Jews as Azariah min-Ha'adumim (Azariah of the Red Family), a play on his name as well as a possible allusion to the fact that he lived in Catholic Italy, Rome being regarded as a spiritual heir of Esau (Edom, from Hebrew `-d-m, red). Combining an insatiable desire for learning with remarkable mental power, Dei Rossi early in life became exceptionally proficient in Hebrew, Latin, and Italian literature. He studied simultaneously medicine, archeology, history, Greek and Roman antiquities, and Christian ecclesiastical history. When about the age of thirty he married and settled for a time at Ferrara. Later he was found at Ancona, Bologna, Sabbionetta, and again at Ferrara. In 1570 a terrible earthquake visited the last-named city and caused the death of about 200 persons. The house in which Dei Rossi lived was partly destroyed; but it happened that at the moment he and his wife were in their daughter's room, which remained uninjured. During the disturbances consequent upon the earthquake Dei Rossi lived in an outlying village, where he was thrown into association with a Christian scholar, who asked him if there existed a Hebrew translation of the Letter of Aristeas. Dei Rossi answered in the negative, but in twenty days he prepared the desired translation, which he entitled Hadrat Zekenim. His account of the earthquake, written shortly after, is entitled Kol Elohim; he regarded the earthquake as a visitation of God, and not merely as a natural phenomenon.

Me'or Enayim

He is known chiefly for his book Me'or Enayim (English, Light of the Eyes) in which he used critical methods to test the literal truth of the Aggadah, the non legalistic and narrative portions of the Talmud. His views were sharply criticised by Judah Loew ben Bezalel (the Maharal of Prague) in the latter's Be'er ha-Golah.

Dei Rossi's great work, Me'or Enayim ("Light of the Eyes") (Mantua, 1573-75; Berlin, 1794; Vienna, 1829; Vilna, 1863-66), includes the two works already mentioned and a third entitled Imre Binah. The latter is divided into four parts; the first part contains a survey of the Jews at the time of the Second Temple, narrates the origin of the Septuagint, points out the contradictions between some of the beliefs of the Talmudists and the proved results of scientific research, records the origin of the Jewish colonies in Alexandria and Cyrene, chronicles the wars of Simon bar Kokhba against the Romans, etc. Dei Rossi quotes from the writings of Philo, whose orthodoxy he questions. He criticizes him for having allegorized Biblical narratives of facts, and points out that the Alexandrian philosopher never gives the traditional interpretation of the Biblical text. (However, he also offers a possible defense of Philo, and reserves a final judgment.)

In the second part Dei Rossi criticizes a number of the assertions of the Talmudists (some of the criticisms were already extant and many of his criticisms were repeated by later commentators), and gives explanations of various aggadic passages which can not be taken literally (as, for instance, the aggadah which attributes the death of Titus to a gnat which entered his brain while he was returning to Rome). The third part is devoted to a study of Jewish chronology and translations from the writings of Philo, Josephus, and others, with commentaries. The fourth part deals with Jewish archeology, describing the shapes of the priestly garments and the glory of the Second Temple, and giving the history of Queen Helen and her two sons.

Attitude of his contemporaries
Dei Rossi's followed the burgeoning scientific method of inquiry in his work and did not rely solely upon tradition. But this way of dealing with subjects which the multitude reverenced as sacred called forth many criticisms on the part of his contemporaries. Prominent among his critics were Moses Provençal of Mantua (to whom Dei Rossi had submitted his work in manuscript), Isaac Finzi of Pesaro, and David Provençal, who endeavored to defend Philo. Dei Rossi appended to some copies of the Me'or Enayim an answer to the criticisms of Moses Provençal, and a dissertation entitled Tzedek Olamim, in which latter he refuted the arguments of Isaac Finzi. Later he wrote a special work entitled Matzref la-Kesef (published by Hirsch Filipowski at Edinburgh, 1854, and included by Zunz in the Vilna edition of the "Me'or"), in which he defended his "Yeme 'Olam" against its critics. Dei Rossi, however, also had to contend with those who considered his "Me'or 'Enayim" as a heretical work. Joseph Caro commissioned Elisha Gallico to draw up a decree to be distributed among all Jews, ordering that the "Me'or 'Enayim" be burned. But, Joseph Caro dying before it was ready for him to sign, the decree was not promulgated, and the rabbis of Mantua contented themselves with forbidding the reading of the work by Jews under twenty-five years of age.

The "Me'or 'Enayim" attracted the attention of many Christian Hebraists, who translated parts of it into Latin.

Dei Rossi was the author of a collection of poems (Venice, n.d.), among which are several of a liturgical character.

Joseph Jacobs and Isaac Broydé, "Ross, Azariah ben Moses dei". Jewish Encyclopedia (Funk and Wagnalls, 1901–1906) cite the following bibliography:
Giovanni Bernardo De Rossi, Dizionario, p. 280;
Zunz, in Kerem Ḥemed, v. 131–138, vii. 119–124;
Rapoport, ib. v. 159–162;
Steinschneider, Cat. Bodl. col. 747;
Jost, Gesch. des Judenthums und Seiner Sekten, iii. 123;
Grätz, Gesch. ix. 405 et seq.;
Zunz, Literaturgeschichte, p. 417;
Ginsburg, Levita's Massoreth ha-Massoreth, p. 52.

Notes

Editions

Azariah de Rossi, The Light of the Eyes Translated from the Hebrew with an introduction and annotations by Joanna Weinberg (New Haven, Yale UP, 2001), 864 pp. (Yale Judaica 31).

External links
Description of Me'or Eynaim

Philosophers of Judaism
16th-century Italian physicians
1510s births
1578 deaths
Rabbis from Mantua
16th-century Italian rabbis
Writers from Mantua